Penne is an extruded type of pasta with cylinder-shaped pieces, their ends cut at an angle. Penne is the plural form of the Italian penna (meaning feather but pen as well), deriving from Latin penna (meaning "feather" or "quill"), and is a cognate of the English word pen. When this format was created, it was intended to imitate the then-ubiquitous steel nib of fountain and dip pens.

Origins
Penne is one of the few pasta shapes with a certain date of birth: in 1865, Giovanni Battista Capurro, a pasta maker from San Martino d'Albaro (Genoa), obtained a patent for a diagonal cutting machine. His invention cut the fresh pasta into a pen shape without crushing it, in a size varying between  mezze penne (half pens) and  penne (pens).

Description and variations

In Italy, penne are produced in two main variants: penne lisce (smooth) and penne rigate (furrowed), the latter having ridges on each penna. Pennoni ("big quills") is a wider version of penne. In English-language contexts, a version is called mostaccioli by various manufacturers, which may be either smooth or ridged in texture.

Penne is traditionally cooked al dente and its shape makes it particularly adapted for sauces, such as pesto, marinara, or arrabbiata. The latter has been celebrated several times in Italian movies, notably in Marco Ferrari's La Grande Bouffe and Federico Fellini's Roma.

See also
 Cuisine of Liguria
 List of Italian dishes
 List of pasta

References

Cuisine of Liguria
Types of pasta